In Spanish grammar,  is the use of  as a second-person singular pronoun, along with its associated verbal forms, in certain regions where the language is spoken.

 is used extensively as the second-person singular in Rioplatense Spanish (Argentina and Uruguay), Eastern Bolivia, Paraguayan Spanish, and Central American Spanish (El Salvador, Guatemala, Honduras, Nicaragua, Costa Rica, southern parts of Chiapas and some parts of Oaxaca in Mexico).  had been traditionally used even in formal writing in Argentina, El Salvador, Costa Rica, Nicaragua, Paraguay, the Philippines and Uruguay. In the dialect of Argentina, Paraguay and Uruguay (known as 'Rioplatense Spanish'),  is also the standard form of use, even in mainstream media. In Argentina, particularly since the last years of the 20th century, it is very common to see billboards and other advertising media using .

 is present in other countries as a regionalism, for instance in the Maracucho Spanish of Zulia State, Venezuela (see Venezuelan Spanish), in the Azuero peninsula of Panama, in various departments in Colombia, and in parts of Ecuador (Sierra down to Esmeraldas). In Peru,  is present in some Andean regions and Cajamarca, but the younger generations have ceased to use it. It is also present in Ladino (spoken by Sephardic Jews throughout Israel, Turkey, the Balkans, Morocco, Latin America and the United States), where it replaces . In the United States, Salvadoran Americans are by far the largest  users followed by other Central Americans, including Guatemalans, Hondurans, Nicaraguans, and Costa Ricans.

 is seldom taught to students of Spanish as a second language, and its precise usage varies across different regions. Nevertheless, in recent years it has become more accepted across the Spanish-speaking world as a valid part of regional dialects.

History

Originally a second-person plural,  came to be used as a more polite second-person singular pronoun to be used among one's familiar friends. The following extract from a late-18th century textbook is illustrative of usage at the time:

Because of the literal meaning of these forms, they were accompanied by the corresponding third-person verb forms. This was the situation when the Spanish language was brought to the Río de la Plata area (around Buenos Aires and Montevideo) and to Chile.

In time,  lost currency in Spain but survived in a number of areas in Spanish-speaking America: Argentina, Paraguay, Bolivia (east), Uruguay, El Salvador, Honduras, Costa Rica, Guatemala, Nicaragua, and some smaller areas; it is not found, or found only in internally remote areas (such as Chiapas) in the countries historically best connected with Spain: Mexico, Panama, Cuba, the Dominican Republic, Venezuela, Colombia, Perú, and Equatorial Guinea.  evolved into  ; in fact,  is still abbreviated as either  or ).

The campaign was initiated by Andrés Bello who considered the use of  a manifestation of lack of education.

Usage

Vos in relation to other forms of tú
The independent disjunctive pronoun  also replaces , from the  set of forms. That is,  is both nominative and the form to use after prepositions. Therefore,  ("for you") corresponds to the  form , etc.

The preposition-pronoun combination  ("with you") is used for the  form .

The possessive pronouns of  also coincide with  <, > rather than with  <, >.

Voseo in Chavacano
Chavacano, a Spanish-based creole, employs .

Conjugation with vos
The 14th and 15th centuries saw an evolution of these conjugations, with  originally giving ,  giving  (or ),  giving , and  giving . Soon analogous forms  and  appeared. Hence the variety of forms the contemporary American  adopts, some varieties featuring a generalized monophthong (most of them), some a generalized diphthong (e.g. Venezuela), and some combining monophthongs and diphthongs, depending on the conjugation (e.g. Chile). In the most general, monophthongized, conjugation paradigm, a difference between  forms and respective  forms is visible exclusively in the present indicative, imperative and subjunctive, and, most of the time, in the preterite.

General conjugation is the one that is most widely accepted and used in various countries such as Argentina, Uruguay, Paraguay, parts of Bolivia, Ecuador, and Colombia, as well as Central American countries.

Some Uruguayan speakers combine the pronoun tú with the vos conjugation (for example, tú sabés). Conversely, speakers in some other places where both tú and vos are used combine vos with the tú conjugation (for example, vos sabes). This is a frequent occurrence in the Argentine province of Santiago del Estero.

Chileans never pronounce these conjugations with a final -s.

In the case of the ending -ís (such as in comís, podís, vivís, erís, venís), the final -s is pronounced like any other final  in Chilean Spanish. It is most often pronounced as an aspiration similar to the 'h' sound in English. It can also be pronounced as a fricative , or be dropped completely. Its variable pronunciation is a phonological rather than a morphological phenomenon.

Venezuelan Maracucho Spanish is notable in that they preserve the diphthongized plural verb forms in all tenses, as still used with vosotros in Spain. Chilean Spanish also notably uses the diphthong .

In Chile, it is much more usual to use tú + vos verb conjugation (tú sabís). The use of pronominal vos (vos sabís) is reserved for very informal situations and may even be considered vulgar in some cases.

Present indicative 
 General conjugation: the final -r of the infinitive is replaced by -s; in writing, an acute accent is added to the last vowel (i.e. the one preceding the final -s) to indicate stress position.
 Chilean:
 the -ar ending of the infinitive is replaced by -ái
 both -er and -ir are replaced by -ís, which sounds more like -íh.
 Venezuelan (Zulian): practically the same ending as modern Spanish vosotros, yet with the final -s being aspirated so that: -áis, -éis, -ís sound like -áih, -éih, -íh (phonetically resembling Chilean).

Unlike tú, which has many irregular forms, the only voseo verbs that are conjugated irregularly in the indicative present are ser, ir and haber. However, haber is seldom used in the indicative present, since there is a strong tendency to use preterite instead of present perfect.

Affirmative imperative 
Vos also differs in its affirmative imperative conjugation from both tú and vosotros. Specifically, the vos imperative is formed by dropping the final -r from the infinitive, but keeping the stress on the last syllable. The only verb that is irregular in this regard is ir; its vos imperative is not usually used, with andá (the vos imperative of andar, which is denoted by *) being generally used instead; except for the Argentine province of Tucumán, where the imperative ite is used. For most regular verbs ending in -ir, the vos imperatives use the same conjugations as the yo form in the preterite; almost all verbs that are irregular in the preterite (which are denoted by ‡) retain the regular vos imperative forms.

Again, the conjugation of tú has far more irregularities, whereas vos has only one irregular verb in the affirmative imperative.

In Chile, the general vos conjugation is not used in the affirmative imperative.

Subjunctive 
In most places where voseo is used, it is applied also in the subjunctive. In the Río de la Plata region, both the tú-conjugation and the voseo conjugation are found, the tú-form being more common. In this variety, some studies have shown a pragmatic difference between the tú-form and the vos-form, such that the vos form carries information about the speaker's belief state, and can be stigmatized. For example, in Central America the subjunctive and negative command form is no mintás, and in Chile it is no mintái; however, in Río de la Plata both no mientas and no mintás are found. Real Academia Española models its voseo conjugation tables on the most frequent, unstigmatized Río de la Plata usage and therefore omits the subjunctive voseo.

Verbal voseo and pronominal voseo 
 "Verbal voseo" refers to the use of the verb conjugation of vos regardless of which pronoun is used.
Verbal voseo with a pronoun other than vos is widespread in Chile, in which case one would use the pronoun tú and the verb conjugation of vos at the same time. E.g.: tú venís, tú escribís, tú podís, tú sabís, tú vai, tú estái.
There are some partially rare cases of a similar sort of verbal voseo in Uruguay where one would say for example tú podés or tú sabés.
 'Pronominal voseo is the use of the pronoun vos regardless of verb conjugation.

Geographical distribution

Countries where voseo is predominant

In South America:
 Argentina — both pronominal and verbal voseo, the pronoun tú is virtually unused.
 Paraguay — both pronominal and verbal voseo, the pronoun tú is virtually unused in most of the country.
 Uruguay — dual-usage of both pronominal and verbal voseo and a combination of the pronoun tú + verb conjugated in the vos form, except near the Brazilian border, where only pronominal and verbal tuteo is common.

In Central America:
 Honduras — both pronominal and verbal voseo throughout all social classes; the pronoun tú is seldom used.
 Nicaragua — both pronominal and verbal voseo throughout all social classes; the pronoun tú is seldom used.
 Costa Rica — voseo has historically been used, back in the 2000s it was losing ground to ustedeo and tuteo, especially among younger speakers. Vos is now primarily used orally with friends and family in Cartago, Guanacaste province, the San José metropolitan area and near the Nicaraguan border and in advertising signage. Usted is the primary form in other areas and with strangers. Tuteo is rarely used, but when it is used in speech by a Costa Rican, it is commonly considered fake and effeminate.
 El Salvador: a two-tiered system is used, that indicates the degree of respect or trust: usted, vos. Usted expresses distance and respect; vos corresponds to an intermediate level, expressing familiarity, but not deep trust but also the pronoun of maximum familiarity and solidarity, and also lack of respect. But sometimes parents even address their young children as usted.

Countries where it is extensive, but not predominant
In South America:
 Bolivia: in the Lowlands of Eastern Bolivia—with mestizo, Criollo and German descendants majority—(Santa Cruz, Beni, Pando, Tarija and the Lowlands of La Paz) voseo is used universally; while in the Highlands of Western Bolivia—with indigenous peoples majority—(highlands of La Paz, Oruro, Potosí, Chuquisaca and Cochabamba) tú is predominant, but there is still a strong use of voseo, especially in verb forms.
 Chile: verbal voseo is spreading north- and southwards from the center, whereas pronominal voseo is reserved only for very intimate situations or to offend someone. In addition, voseo in Chile is only used in informal situations; in every other situation, the normal tú or usted pronouns are used.

Countries where voseo occurs in some areas
In the following countries, voseo is used in certain areas:
 Colombia, in the departments:
in the west (Pacific Coast)
Chocó
Valle del Cauca
Cauca
Nariño
in the center, primarily Paisa Region (Departments of Antioquia, Risaralda, Quindío, and Caldas).
in the (North) East
Norte de Santander - Ocaña Region
La Guajira
Cesar
Cuba in the eastern side of the country
 Ecuador in the Sierra, the center, and Esmeraldas
 Panama in the west along the border to Costa Rica
Puerto Rico at the eastern end of the island, in Fajardo, a frequent voseo that is not shared by cultured speakers.
 Venezuela, in the northwest (primarily in Zulia State)
 Philippines, among Chavacano speakers in Mindanao and Luzón, but is otherwise absent in standard Spanish.
 Mexico, widely used in the countryside of the state of Chiapas, it is becoming rare in Yucatán, Tabasco and Quintana Roo. Mainly used by not-enrolled indigenous people.
 Peru, in some areas in both the Northern and Southern ends of the country.

Countries where vos is virtually absent from usage
In the following countries, the use of vos has disappeared completely and is not used at all.
Spain
Dominican Republic
Equatorial Guinea

Synchronic analysis of Chilean and River Plate verbal voseo
The traditional assumption that Chilean and River Plate voseo verb forms are derived from those corresponding to vosotros has been challenged as synchronically inadequate in a 2014 article, on the grounds that it requires at least six different rules, including three monophthongization processes that completely lack phonological motivation. Alternatively, the article argues that the Chilean and River Plate voseo verb forms are synchronically derived from underlying representations that coincide with those corresponding to the non-honorific second person singular tú. First, both Chilean and River Plate  has an accentuation rule which assigns stress to the syllable following the verb's root, or its infinitive in the case of the future and conditional conjugations. This alone derives all the River Plate  verb conjugations, in all tenses. Chilean verb forms also undergo rules of semi-vocalization, vowel raising, and aspiration. In semi-vocalization,  becomes the semivowel  when after ; thus,  becomes , and  becomes  'you are'. The vowel raising rule turns stressed  into , so  becomes .

The proposed theory requires the use of only one special rule in the case of Chilean voseo. This rule plus other rules that are independently justified in the language make it possible to synchronically derive all the Chilean and River Plate voseo verb forms in a straightforward manner. The article additionally solves the problem posed by the alternate verbal forms of Chilean voseo like the future indicative (e.g. bailaríh or  'you will dance'), the present indicative forms of haber (habíh and hai 'you have'), and the present indicative of ser (soi, eríh and eréi 'you are'), without resorting to any ad hoc rules. All these different verb forms would come from different underlying representations. The theoretical framework of the article is that of classic generative phonology.

Attitudes
In some countries, the pronoun vos is used with family and friends (T-form), like tú in other varieties of Spanish, and contrasts with the respectful usted (V-form used with third person) which is used with strangers, elderly, and people of higher socioeconomic status; appropriate usage varies by dialect. In Central America, vos can be used among those considered equals, while usted maintains its respectful usage. In Ladino, the pronoun usted is completely absent, so the use of vos with strangers and elders is the standard.

Voseo was long considered a backwards or uneducated usage by prescriptivist grammarians. With the changing mentalities in the Hispanic world, and with the development of descriptive as opposed to prescriptive linguistics, it has become simply a local variant of Spanish. In some places it has become symbolically important and is pointed to with pride as a local defining characteristic.

See also

Similar trends of personal pronouns in Portuguese
Spanish dialects and varieties
Spanish verbs
T–V distinction#Romance languages

References

Sources
  Díaz Collazos, Ana María. Desarrollo sociolingüístico del voseo en la región andina de Colombia.
  El voseo at Spanish Wikibooks
  Le Voseo
  Voseo Spanish Site dedicated to teaching Argentine Voseo usage
  Carricaburo. Norma Beatriz (2003). El voseo en la historia y en la lengua de hoy - Las fórmulas de tratamiento en el español actual
  Hotta. Hideo (2000). La estandarización y el regionalismo en el voseo del español argentino
  Roca, Luis Alberto (2007). Breve historia del habla cruceña y su mestizaje
  Rosenblat, Ángel (2000). El castellano en Venezuela
  Toursinov, Antón (2005). Formas pronominales de tratamiento en el español actual de Guatemala

Spanish grammar
Personal pronouns
Second-person pronouns

fr:Dialectologie de la langue espagnole#Voseo